Skeld (Shield or shelter) refers to two villages on the south side of the West Mainland of Shetland, Scotland. The main village is called Easter Skeld, while the western end of the settlement, about a mile away, is known as Wester Skeld. The council housing estate in Skeld is called Grindybrecks. It also has a school on a hill.

Notable residents
The great 20th-century poet Vagaland's father was from Skeld, and he was born Thomas Alexander Robertson at nearby Westerwick. Vagaland retained a love for and a sense of belonging to this part of Shetland, though he moved to Walls as a small child.

Erraid Davies, swimmer and bronze medallist at the 2014 Commonwealth Games, lives in Skeld.

References

Sources
 This article is based on http://shetlopedia.com/Skeld a GFDL wiki.

External links

Shetland.gov.uk - Skeld

Villages in Mainland, Shetland